The 2005 North Rhine-Westphalia state election was held on 22 May 2005 to elect the 14th Landtag of North Rhine-Westphalia. The outgoing government was a coalition of the Social Democratic Party (SPD) and The Greens led by Minister-President Peer Steinbrück.

The result was a landslide defeat for the SPD, as the party suffered its worst result in 50 years at 37% and was ousted from government for the first time since 1966. The opposition Christian Democratic Union (CDU) under Jürgen Rüttgers won a commanding victory with 45% of votes and came just short of a majority in the Landtag. The Greens also suffered losses, as did the Free Democratic Party (FDP), with both finishing on 6.2%. The CDU subsequently formed a coalition with the FDP, and Rüttgers was elected Minister-President by the Landtag on 22 June.

The result had important ramifications outside North Rhine-Westphalia: such a crushing defeat for the SPD in a stronghold state was viewed as an indication of unpopularity of the federal government led by Gerhard Schröder. On the evening of the election, Schröder announced he would seek an early federal election.

Electoral system
The Landtag was elected via mixed-member proportional representation. 128 members were elected in single-member constituencies via first-past-the-post voting, and 53 then allocated using compensatory proportional representation. A single ballot was used for both. The minimum size of the Landtag was 181 members, but if overhang seats were present, proportional leveling seats were added to ensure proportionality. Since the previous election in 2000, an electoral reform had been passed which reduced the number of single-member constituencies by 23 and the overall size of the Landtag by 20 members. An electoral threshold of 5% of valid votes is applied to the Landtag; parties that fall below this threshold are ineligible to receive seats.

Background

In the previous election held on 14 May 2000, the SPD suffered losses and slid to 43% of the vote, while the CDU recorded another poor performance with 37%. The Greens also declined to 7% while the FDP recovered to 10% and re-entered the Landtag. The outgoing SPD–Green government retained a reduced majority and was renewed for a second term.

In November 2002, Minister-President Wolfgang Clement resigned to join the second Schröder cabinet as minister for economics and labour. He was succeeded by state finance minister Peer Steinbrück, who continued the coalition with the Greens.

Parties
The table below lists parties represented in the 13th Landtag of North Rhine-Westphalia.

A total of 22 parties and lists ran in the election, as did 17 independent candidates. A total of 1,343 candidates stood for election, of which 273 (20.3%) were women. Only the four parliamentary parties as well as The Republicans and Labour and Social Justice ran candidates in all 128 constituencies. Due to the single-vote system, the number of constituencies in which each party stood determined how much of the electorate they were able to reach, and thus how many votes they could gather.

Campaign
Peer Steinbrück, who had been Minister-President for two and a half years by the time of the election, stood as lead candidate for the SPD. As in 2000, the CDU nominated state chairman Jürgen Rüttgers. Environment minister Bärbel Höhn led the Greens for a fourth time, and the FDP put forward Landtag group leader Ingo Wolf. The SPD and Greens aimed to continue their coalition, while the CDU and FDP sought to oust them with a coalition of their own. Polls showed the two blocs neck and neck at the start of the year, but the CDU and FDP established a strong lead by the start of March. Minister-President Peer Steinbrück remained popular and led Rüttgers in terms of personal polling; the SPD relied heavily on his personal image and placed less emphasis on the party brand, which was dragged down by federal issues The SPD also faced a challenge from the left in the form of WASG, a party founded by trade unionists and disgruntled SPD members opposed to the federal government's Agenda 2010. Important topics in the campaign were coal mining subsidies, wind energy, education, and the high unemployment rate.

Opinion polling

Results

Aftermath
Immediate coverage of the election was overwhelmed by its impact on federal politics: only half an hour after the polls closed, first SPD chairman Franz Müntefering and then Chancellor Gerhard Schröder announced the government's intention to seek an early dissolution of the Bundestag. A federal election had originally not been due until September of 2006, but Schröder and Müntefering felt the need for a renewed mandate for the government's agenda in light of a string of defeats on the state level, of which North Rhine-Westphalia was the most significant as it was a longtime stronghold of the SPD. The result also marked the defeat of the last incumbent SPD-Green state government. This led to a knock-on effect as Schröder quickly brought and deliberately lost a motion of confidence in the Bundestag and subsequently dissolved it. With the election looming, parties were forced to accelerate the selection and announcement of candidates; Angela Merkel was announced as the CDU/CSU's Chancellor candidate just a week after the election in North Rhine-Westphalia. These developments greatly overshadowed the state election and its local consequences, which receded into the background of coverage.

Polling conducted by Forschungsgruppe Wahlen reported that the poor economic situation, unpopular federal government, and weak perception of the state government were the most decisive factors in the outcome. On the key issue of unemployment, voters trusted the CDU much more than the SPD.

Government formation
The CDU and FDP quickly began negotiations for a coalition government. The former were led by Jürgen Rüttgers, while the FDP were led by lead candidate Ingo Wolf and state chairman Andreas Pinkwart. The draft coalition agreement was presented less than a month after the election on 17 June, and quickly ratified almost unanimously by both parties.

The new Landtag was inaugurated on 8 June, and Regina van Dinther was elected President. Jürgen Rüttgers was elected Minister-President two weeks later on the 22nd, winning 99 votes in favour to 87 against. His cabinet took office on 24 June.

External links

References

Elections in North Rhine-Westphalia